The National Cybersecurity Center (NCC)  was founded in 2016 as a 501(c)(3) nonprofit organization in Colorado Springs, Colorado. It was started from a vision of then Governor John Hickenlooper, in coordination with several people from the University of Colorado Colorado Springs (UCCS) and the community. The NCC serves both public and private organizations and individuals through training, education, and research.   

The NCC is not to be confused with the National Cybersecurity and Communications Integration Center (NCCIC), an office within the United States Department of Homeland Security.

Leadership

Ed Rios was CEO of the NCC from October 2016 to 2018.
Vance Brown was CEO from 2018 to 2020.
In 2020, Harry D. Raduege, Jr., Lieutenant General, USAF (Ret.) became CEO.

Board members included
Senator John Hickenlooper, Governor Jared Polis, Mayor John Suthers, 
and several retired US military officers.

 Kyle Hybl (Chairman of the Board)
 Andre McGregor  (Vice Chairman of the Board)
 Harry Raduege (CEO and Board President)
 Forrest Senti (Board Secretary)
 Mayor John Suthers (Past Chairman)
 Ed Anderson
 Christian Anschutz
 Kathy Boe
 Rick Crandall
 Kim Crider
 Honorable Karen S. Evans
 Sen. John Hickenlooper
 Leslie Kershaw
 Gary McAlum
 Dawn Meyerriecks
 Erik Mitisek
 Governor Jared Polis
 Greg Oslan
 Chancellor Venkat Reddy
 Ed Rios
 Mark Weatherford
 Senior Vice Chancellor Martin Wood

Mission and vision

Mission 
To build a collaborative, operational and interdisciplinary model for cybersecurity and space that transforms our nation’s ability to detect, protect and deter threats.

Vision 
Our vision is to power the integration of cybersecurity into every facet of society so that interdisciplinary solutions can preempt emerging cyber and space threats.

Cyber education 

The National Cybersecurity Center provides cybersecurity leadership, with two main pillars: K-12 education with the NCC Student Alliance, and the Adult Education Initiative.

Student Alliance 
The NCCSA is a Cyber Education Student Organization focusing on cybersecurity. The mission of the NCCSA is to respond to the urgent demand for trained cybersecurity talent while recognizing the importance of providing students with knowledge, career, and academic pathway information in this exciting and critical field.
NCCSA is a school-based network of student-run chapters providing learning, competing, leadership, soft-skills development, networking, skill-building, and social opportunities. It began as a grassroots effort of students, teachers, community college peers, and the NCC, who collaborated with partners and stakeholders to organize a student organization that meets the needs of cyberstudents across the country.The NCC has hosted cyber camps, captured the flag, and other events for the students to get hands-on experience.

Cyber Force 
The NCC Cyber Force Initiative is designed to increase the number of cybersecurity professionals in the workforce and increase the number of underrepresented groups in the cybersecurity workforce.  The NCC offers both self-guide and instructor-led classes.

Space Information Sharing and Analysis Center 
On April 8, 2019, the NCC announced a partnership with Space ISAC. The Space ISAC is an Information Sharing and Analysis Center focused on space industry threats. Space ISAC collaborates across the global space industrial base to enhance the nation's ability to prepare for and respond to vulnerabilities, incidents, and threats. Space ISAC provides members with timely and actionable information and serves as the primary communications channel for the sector. The NCC serves as the executive, operational, and administrative function of the Space ISAC.

On February 25, 2021, the Space Information Sharing and Analysis Center (Space ISAC) announced a significant milestone, declaring the organization has reached Initial Operating Capability (IOC) following the launch of Space ISAC’s member portal and threat intelligence sharing platform. This capability will serve as the first of its kind, enabling commercial industry and international space partners to share timely, actionable information about space-based threats.

On May 5, 2022, the NCC participated in the ribbon-cutting ceremony held by the University of Colorado Colorado Springs (UCCS) to celebrate the expansion of the Kevin W. O’Neil Cybersecurity Education and Research Center and Space Information Sharing and Analysis Center (Space ISAC). This facility, which houses the Space Information Sharing and Analysis Center(ISAC), is the only all-threats security information source for the public and private space sector, operated by the NCC since its formation in 2019.

Founding members 
Founding board member include Kratos Defense & Security Solutions, Inc., Booz Allen Hamilton, MITRE, SES, Lockheed Martin, Northrop Grumman, Parsons Corporation, Purdue University, the Space Dynamics Laboratory, the Johns Hopkins University Applied Physics Laboratory, the Aerospace Corporation, and the University of Colorado Colorado Springs.

Cybersecurity for State Leaders 
 
In 2020, the National Cybersecurity Center introduced an initiative to train elected officials in state governments and their staff members on cyber hygiene and IT security.

Cybersecurity for State Leaders (CfSL) is a program of the NCC supported by Google. The program trained state legislatures on cybersecurity best practices through live, viral, on-demand, and text courses. The program aims to educate state lawmakers and staff on "ways to strengthen defenses against digital attacks". A series of experts from all over the country including West Virginia U.S. Senator Joe Manchin, former DHS Cybersecurity Deputy Undersecretary Mark Weatherford, senior experts and researchers at Google, Microsoft, and IBM,  Shark Tank’s Shark and cybersecurity guru Robert Herjavec, helped teach some of the top cyber tips.

Colorado Cyber Resource Center 
In 2021 the National Cybersecurity Center (NCC) announced the launch of the Colorado Cyber Resource Center (CCRC) to help Colorado’s local governments, school districts, special districts, and critical infrastructure towards a more cyber-secure future.

The Colorado Cyber Resource Center is the shared product of the Colorado Whole of State Working Group and the NCC. Led by local jurisdictions and supporting state and federal agencies, the Whole of State Working Group has evolved over the past several years into an organized collaborative working towards rising the tide of cybersecurity in Colorado. Concerned with the needs of our least-resourced jurisdictions, the Working Group uses feedback from smaller jurisdictions as a starting point for developing cyber resources in Colorado.

PISCES 
The CCRC will soon serve as the hub for Colorado’s chapter of PISCES- an initiative that helps monitor network flows of smaller jurisdictions at no charge while allowing cybersecurity students to gain experience that translates into workforce talent. The Public Infrastructure Security Cyber Education System (PISCES) provides qualified students with curricula and supervised experiences to act as entry-level cyber analysts. Students analyze streaming data for small communities or municipalities who may otherwise not be able to obtain cybersecurity to the extent needed. Through PISCES, a reliable, high-quality pipeline is being developed to address the shortage of cyber professionals ready for the workforce.

PISCES works with professors to develop a curriculum for students in cyber-related fields and to give those students controlled access to real data from communities and municipalities. Students learn and enhance their skills in detecting threats while providing information to the municipalities and communities to secure the threat and prevent future attacks.

Cyber range 
In January 2022, the Colorado Cyber Resource Center partnered with RangeForce to launch a statewide cyber range available to K-12 students and career-transitioning adults alike.

See also 
 National Cyber Security Alliance, which assists U.S. home users, small businesses and education
 National Cybersecurity Center of Excellence, which assists businesses
 NH-ISAC, in healthcare
 National Cyber Security Centre (disambiguation)
National Cybersecurity Center - YouTube

References

Cyberwarfare in the United States
United States
United States Department of Homeland Security